There are three historic airship hangars at Moffett Field, in Mountain View in the southern San Francisco Bay Area, California. Hangar One (built 1931/2) is based on a structure of steel girders, while Hangars Two and Three (built 1941/2) are of wood. They are among the world's largest freestanding structures.

Hangar One 

Hangar One was originally built in the 1930s to house US Navy rigid airships, the USS Macon (ZRS-5) in particular.

Hangars Two and Three 

Moffett Field's Hangars Two and Three were built at the beginning of World War II to house US Navy blimps for a program of coastal defense. They are still among the world's largest freestanding unsupported wood structures.

1940 
In 1940, the US Navy proposed to the US Congress the development of a lighter-than-air station program for anti-submarine patrolling of the coast and harbours. This program proposed the construction of new stations in addition to the expansion at Naval Air Stations (NAS) M and Lakehurst.

Included at each site were helium storage and service, barracks for 228 men, power plant, landing apron, and a mobile mooring mast.

Wooden hangars

1941 
The Second Deficiency Appropriation Bill for 1941, passed on 3 July 1941, introduced strict control of strategic materials like steel causing a change in construction material to wood. Standardized plans were drawn up by the Navy Department Bureau of Yards and Docks, with Arsham Amirikian acting as principal engineer.

1942 
A total of 51 Douglas Fir heavy-timber trusses resting on concrete bent frames contain the two-story shop and office areas.

1943 
A total of 17 wooden hangars were commissioned by the Navy Department Bureau of Yards and Docks in 1943, including those at Naval Air Station Lakehurst (2), Naval Air Station Moffett Field (2), Naval Air Station South Weymouth (1), Naval Air Station Weeksville (1), Naval Air Station Glynco (2), Naval Lighter Than Air Station Richmond (3), Naval Air Station Houma (1), Naval Air Station Hitchcock (1), Naval Lighter-Than-Air Station Santa Ana (2) and Naval Air Station Tillamook (2), with each hangar accommodating six airships.

Present day 
Seven of the original seventeen wooden hangars still exist in the U.S.: Moffett Field (2), Tustin, California (2), Tillamook, Oregon (1), and Lakehurst, New Jersey(2).

These hangars have a monumental presence, and the Moffett Field pair, set within a paved expanse of the airfield, are a familiar landmark in the San Francisco Bay Area.

Popular culture 
An episode of the Discovery Channel TV show MythBusters used one these hangars to disprove the myth that it is not possible to fold a sheet of paper in half more than seven times. The sheet of paper covered nearly the full width of the airship hangar. Other episodes of Mythbusters have utilized the hangar to test myths such as "Inflating a football with helium allows longer kick distances" and "Airworthy aircraft can be constructed of concrete."

References 

Aircraft hangars in the United States
Buildings and structures in Mountain View, California
Military facilities in the San Francisco Bay Area
Buildings of the United States Navy
Transportation buildings and structures in Santa Clara County, California
Moffett Field
Closed installations of the United States Navy